Jeffrey "Jeff" Birch (21 October 1927 – June 2005) was an English professional footballer who played as a winger in the Football League for York City, in non-League football for Selby Town and Scarborough, and was on the books of Sheffield United without making a league appearance.

References

1927 births
2005 deaths
Footballers from Sheffield
English footballers
Association football forwards
Selby Town F.C. players
Sheffield United F.C. players
Scarborough F.C. players
York City F.C. players
Midland Football League players
English Football League players